Joseph Kevin Walsh (born 13 May 1992) is a Welsh professional footballer who plays as a defender for League One club Lincoln City.

Club career

Swansea City
Walsh was born in Cardiff, South Glamorgan. He joined Swansea as an under-16 player after previously playing for Cardiff College Celts. In his first season, he helped the Swans to FAW Youth Cup glory against his hometown club, Cardiff City, at their old Ninian Park ground. He was drafted into the first-team squad for a match against Derby County for Swansea in February 2010 as cover following the late injury sustained by Garry Monk. Walsh was handed his first professional deal with the club prior to the 2010–11 season. He made his first team debut on 10 August 2010 in a 3–0 win over Barnet in the League Cup.

Crawley Town
Walsh joined Crawley Town following his release from Premier League Swansea City at the end of the 2011–12 season. He was voted the club's Player of the Year and Young Player of the Year for the 2013–14 season and ahead of the 2014–15 season was rewarded with the club captaincy. In total, Walsh made 110 appearances in all competitions for the club, and scored 9 goals.

Milton Keynes Dons
After a short spell on loan, newly promoted Championship club Milton Keynes Dons confirmed on 28 May 2015 that Walsh had signed a two-year deal at the club for an undisclosed fee.
Walsh scored his first goal for Milton Keynes Dons on 16 January 2016 in a 1–0 home victory over Reading. On 18 August 2017, Walsh signed a new contract keeping him at the club until June 2020.

Lincoln City
On 13 August 2020, it was announced that Walsh would become Lincoln City's seventh signing of the summer, following the expiry of his contract with Milton Keynes Dons. He would eventually make his debut on 17 October 2020, starting the game away to Fleetwood Town helping to keep a clean sheet. After a run of 4 starts and 4 clean-sheets, Walsh would injure his knee ruling him out for up to 12 weeks. He would sign a new long-term contract, less than a year at the club on 28 March 2021. His first goal for the club came against Morecambe on 19 November 2022.

International career
In January 2013, Walsh was selected in the Wales U21 squad for the friendly match against Iceland on 6 February 2013. In October 2014 he was called into the Wales senior squad for the Euro 2016 qualifying matches against Bosnia-Herzegovina and Cyprus. On 8 November 2016, Walsh was called up once again to the Wales senior squad for their 2018 World Cup qualifier against Serbia.

Career statistics

Honours
Milton Keynes Dons
EFL League Two third-place promotion: 2018–19

Individual
Crawley Town Player of the Year: 2013–14
Crawley Town Young Player of the Year: 2013–14

References

External links

1992 births
Living people
Footballers from Cardiff
Welsh footballers
Wales youth international footballers
Wales under-21 international footballers
Association football defenders
Swansea City A.F.C. players
Crawley Town F.C. players
Milton Keynes Dons F.C. players
Lincoln City F.C. players
English Football League players